Lara Barbieri (born 2 February 1986 in Sassuolo) is an Italian football midfielder, currently playing for Sassuolo in Italy's Serie A.

Biography
Barbieri has also played for Reggiana, Riviera di Romagna, Napoli and Michigan Phoenix in the United States' WPSL. She won the Italian Women's Cup in 2010, playing all the matches.

Titles
 Italian Women's Cup: 2010

Appearances and goals
Updated on 27 February 2014.

References

1986 births
Living people
Italian women's footballers
A.S.D. Reggiana Calcio Femminile players
Serie A (women's football) players
Women's association football midfielders
U.S. Sassuolo Calcio (women) players
A.S.D. Calcio Chiasiellis players
S.S.D. Napoli Femminile players
People from Sassuolo
Footballers from Emilia-Romagna
Roma Calcio Femminile players
Sportspeople from the Province of Modena